MRCS can refer to:

Mongolian Red Cross Society
Malaysian Red Crescent Society
Myanmar Red Cross Society
Membership of the Royal Colleges of Surgeons of Great Britain and Ireland